The Billboard 200, published in Billboard magazine, is a weekly chart that ranks the highest-selling music albums and EPs in the United States. Before Nielsen SoundScan began tracking sales in 1991, Billboard estimated sales from a representative sampling of record stores nationwide, using telephone, fax or messenger service. Data were based on rankings made by the record stores of the best-selling records, not on actual sales figures.

There were only five number-one albums in 1984, the fewest in history. Michael Jackson's Thriller, which spent twenty-two weeks in 1983 at number one, stayed an additional fifteen weeks at the top in 1984 and was the best-selling album of the year. Thriller was the only album to be the best-seller of two years (1983–1984) in the United States until 21 by Adele in 2011 and 2012.  Footloose, the original soundtrack of the Paramount motion picture, Footloose, which included the two number one hits, "Footloose" by Kenny Loggins and "Let's Hear It for the Boy" by Deniece Williams, spent ten weeks at number one, sold over seven million copies and received a nomination for Best Score Soundtrack Album for a Motion Picture at the 27th Grammy Awards. Rock band Huey Lewis and the News released their third album Sports in 1983. Despite the limited expectations of their record company and the blockbuster competition from other albums like Thriller and Born in the U.S.A, Sports managed to top the chart for one week and sold six million copies, reaching the second position of the year-end chart of 1984.

In 1984, singer-songwriter Bruce Springsteen released his seventh studio album Born in the U.S.A. Springsteen ignored the musical movements of the Second British Invasion, instead he embraced the legacy of Phil Spector's and the garage bands releases with more radio-friendly arrangements, the use of synthesizers and incorporating new electronic textures while keeping the American rock & roll from the early 1960s. The album stayed four weeks at number one, yielded seven top ten singles and sold more than seven and a half million copies. Purple Rain, the soundtrack from the film of the same name, was the first Prince album to be recorded with and credited to his backing group The Revolution. The album was loaded with life, invention, pure rock & roll, with synthesizer touches that pushed heavily into psychedelic music, and have constant reminders of Sly Stone in the bass lines, which make it the most pop-oriented album Prince has ever made. The album topped the chart for the last twenty-two weeks of the year, sold more than nine million copies, won the Grammy Award for Best Score Soundtrack Album for a Motion Picture and received a nomination for Album of the Year.

Chart history

See also
1984 in music
List of Billboard 200 number-one albums

References

1984
1984 in American music
United States Albums